The Pittsburgh Parking Authority is a municipal authority that owns and operates public parking facilities in Pittsburgh. It was established under the Parking Authority Law of Pennsylvania, Act of June 5, 1947, P.L. 458, as amended and supplemented, 53 P.S. SS 341 et seq.

References

Transportation in Pittsburgh
Municipal authorities in Pennsylvania
Government of Pittsburgh